The 2018 Saudi Super Cup was the 5th edition of the Saudi Super Cup, an annual football match played between the winners of the previous season's Saudi Pro League and King's Cup. It was played on 18 August 2018 by Al-Hilal, the winners of the 2017–18 Saudi Pro League, and Al-Ittihad, the winners of the 2018 King Cup. The match was held at Loftus Road in London, England for the second time. Al-Hilal won the match 2–1 securing their second title in the competition.

Venue

Loftus Road was announced as the venue of the final on 27 July 2018. This was the second time Loftus Road hosted the final and was the third time it was hosted in London.

Loftus Road was built in 1904 and has been used as the home stadium of Queens Park Rangers since 1917. Its current capacity is 18,439, and the record attendance was 35,353 in 1974.

Background

This was Al-Hilal's third appearance in the competition. Al-Hilal won the 2015 edition and finished as runners-up in 2016. This was Al-Ittihad's second appearance in the competition. They finished as runners-up in 2013 after losing to Al-Fateh.

The 2017 edition which was supposed to be contested between Al-Hilal and Al-Ittihad was canceled. The decision was based on the request of then-Saudi national team manager, Edgardo Bauza, who expressed his desire to change the calendar of the season to help him set the ideal preparation program for the 2018 FIFA World Cup.

Al-Hilal qualified by winning the 2017–18 Saudi Professional League on the final matchday by defeating Al-Fateh 4–1. Al-Ittihad qualified by winning their ninth King Cup title by defeating Al-Faisaly 3–1 in the final. The was the 141st meeting between these two sides in all competitions. Al-Hilal won 56 times while Al-Ittihad won 42 times and the two teams drew 42 times. This was the tenth final between these two sides, with Al-Ittihad winning five times and Al-Hilal winning four times.

Match

Details
<onlyinclude>

{| width="100%"
|valign="top" width="40%"|

Statistics

See also
 2017–18 Saudi Professional League
 2018 King Cup

References 

Saudi Super Cup
2018–19 in Saudi Arabian football
Sports competitions in Saudi Arabia
August 2018 sports events in the United Kingdom
Al Hilal SFC matches
Ittihad FC matches